KMWA Vidya Niketan Composite PU College is a pre-university college in  Bangalore, Karnataka, India. It is affiliated to Karnataka Pre-University Education Board. It is located at 12th Cross, Mahalakshmipuram

Streams offered
The College offers courses in the below mentioned science streams
1. PCMB - Physics, Chemistry, Mathematics, Biology
2. PCMC - Physics, Chemistry, Mathematics, Computer Science

Facilities
1.	Well Equipped  laboratories
2.	Library
3.	Canteen
4.	Transportation Facilities
5.	Playground

References

Pre University colleges in Karnataka
High schools and secondary schools in Bangalore